Teredo is a genus of highly modified saltwater clams which bore in wood and live within the tunnels they create. They are commonly known as "shipworms;" however, they are not worms, but marine bivalve molluscs (phylum Mollusca) in the taxonomic family Teredinidae. The type species is Teredo navalis.

The tunneling habit of species in the genus inspired the name of the Teredo network tunneling protocol.  The submarine HMS Teredo may also have been named after this genus, which works invisibly, below the surface, and can be very damaging to marine installations made of wood.

Diet

Like most marine based bivalves, teredo worms are primarily filter feeders and consume mostly seston, and not wood. Wood supplements their primary diet and is consumed with the assistance of bacteria inside their [gill] cells. However, wood is not a necessary part of their diet and they can live on the surface both of wooden and non-wooden structures.

Species
Species within the genus Teredo include:
 Teredo aegypos Moll, 1941
 Teredo bartschi Clapp, 1923
 Teredo bitubula Li, 1965
 Teredo clappi Bartsch, 1923
 Teredo fulleri Clapp, 1924
 Teredo furcifera Martens in Semon, 1894
 Teredo johnsoni Clapp, 1924
 Teredo mindanensis Bartsch, 1923
 Teredo navalis Linnaeus, 1758
 Teredo poculifer Iredale, 1936
 Teredo portoricensis Clapp, 1924
 Teredo somersi Clapp, 1924
 Teredo triangularis Edmondson, 1942

Gallery

See also
 Teredora princesae

References

External links
 

 
Bivalve genera
Taxa named by Carl Linnaeus